"This Is for the Poor" is a song by English indie rock band, The Others, and is featured on their debut album, The Others. Released on 17 May 2004, it was the first single from the album and charted at #42.

Track listing
 "This Is for the Poor"
 "How I Nearly Lost You"
 "Almanac"

References

2004 singles
The Others (band) songs
2004 songs
Mercury Records singles
Song articles with missing songwriters